The 1976–77 Cypriot First Division was the 38th season of the Cypriot top-level football league.

Overview
It was contested by 16 teams, and AC Omonia won the championship.

League standings

Results

References
Cyprus - List of final tables (RSSSF)

Cypriot First Division seasons
Cypriot First Division, 1976-77
1